Irreligion in Belgium pertains to citizens of Belgium that are atheist, agnostic, or otherwise unaffiliated with any religion. Irreligion is the second most common religious stance in Belgium, following Catholicism.

History 
The Constitution of Belgium guaranteed the right to freedom of religion when it was enacted in 1831. Articles 19-21 provide for protections of secularism: the Constitution of Belgium guarantees the freedom of worship and its public practice, forbids the obligation of any religious practices, and disallows government intervention or involvement in a religion's leadership.

The First School War was a dispute between Catholicism and secularism in schools in the 1880s. The dispute was revived in the Second School War in the 1950s.

Demographics 
Religion has declined in Belgium, though Catholicism still remains large among the Belgian population. As of 2018, 29.3% of Belgians are irreligious. 20.2% of Belgians identify as not religious, while 9.1% identify as atheist.

Secular groups 
Due to pillarization which is in place in Belgium, irreligious individuals and families who desire to receive counseling and celebration for life moments often go to institutions of organized secularism, including secular organizations or liberal philosophical organizations which are headed and led by clergy-like officials known as "counsellors".

Organized secularism is recognized by Belgium as a philosophy that exists alongside religious groups and receives state funding.

See also 

 Demographics of Belgium
 Freedom of religion in Belgium
 Religion in Belgium

References

Religion in Belgium
Belgium
Secularism in Belgium